Kenneth Evans may refer to:
 Kenneth Evans (actor) (1888–1954) in 1942 film In Which We Serve
 Kenneth Evans (bishop of Ontario) (1903–1970)
 Kenneth Evans (bishop of Dorking) (1915–2007)
 Kenneth A. Evans (1898–1970), American Republican businessman and politician